Stromboli has been borne by at least four ships of the Italian Navy:

 , an  launched in 1886 and scrapped in 1911.
 , previously the mercantile Bohemie purchased by Italy in 1916 and renamed. She was discarded in 1919.
 , previously a mercantile  purchased by Italy in 1948 and used as a transport ship. She was stricken in 1972.
 , a  launched in 1975.

References

Italian Navy ship names